Radica Choneva (born 8 November 2001) is a Macedonian footballer who plays as a striker for Istatov and the North Macedonia national team.

International career
Choneva made her debut for the North Macedonia national team on 25 November 2021, coming on as a substitute for Kristina Petrushevska against Northern Ireland.

References

2001 births
Living people
Women's association football defenders
Macedonian women's footballers
North Macedonia women's international footballers